The Williams FW40 was a Formula One racing car designed by Williams to compete in the 2017 Formula One season. The car was predominantly driven by Felipe Massa and Lance Stroll, who made his Formula One début with the team.

Background 
The number '40' in the chassis name signified the 40th anniversary of the team. In addition, it was the last Formula One car that Massa drove in his career, as he announced his retirement for a second time in November. In Belgium, the car appeared in British motorcycle rider Guy Martin's series Speed with Guy Martin.

Competition history

Williams started the season as the fourth quickest team ahead of arch rivals Force India. However, the team could not finish consistently in the points, and Lance Stroll finished only thrice in the first 7 races. This saw the team languishing in 6th in the Constructors' Championship behind Toro Rosso and 49 points behind Force India.

At the Canadian Grand Prix, Stroll earned his first F1 points by finishing in ninth. Stroll earned his first podium by finishing third in the chaotic Azerbaijan Grand Prix. By doing so, Stroll became the second youngest driver to be on the podium, and the youngest driver on the podium in his debut season. This result brought Williams up to 5th in the Constructors' standings, behind Force India but ahead of Toro Rosso.

At the Hungarian Grand Prix, Massa withdrew from the race weekend when he became ill after the third practice session on Saturday. Williams confirmed reserve driver and Sky Sports F1 pundit Paul di Resta would replace Massa for the rest of the weekend. It was his first appearance in an F1 car in a competitive session in 3 years, and was his first time driving the 2017 spec-car.

Complete Formula One results
(key) (results in bold indicate pole position; results in italics indicate fastest lap)

 Driver failed to finish the race, but was classified as they had completed greater than 90% of the race distance.

References

External links

Williams Formula One cars
2017 Formula One season cars